Ronni Vindahl is a Danish music producer, composer, re-mixer and musician. He is co-founder of the Copenhagen-based music collective Boom Clap Bachelors, and has worked with artists such as MØ, Avicii, and Kendrick Lamar. Vindahl occasionally also writes and records under his own name, and released his first solo album in 2012. He is Grammy Awards-nominated.

Biography 

Ronni began playing guitar at the age of 12, and started producing at 18. It was also around that time that he co-founded the Copenhagen-based music collective Boom Clap Bachelors together with Robin Hannibal. Their track, Tiden Flyver, later got sampled by Kendrick Lamar on his track "Bitch Don't Kill My Vibe".

Vindahl's first international appearance was in 2008, when Gilles Peterson released the Boom Clap Bachelor's track "Combiner" – produced, co- written and performed by Vindahl – on his compilation Brownswood Bubblers. vol. 2 on Gilles Peterson's own record label Brownswood. Peterson also put "Combinér" in rotation on his weekly radio show on BBC1, which gave Vindahl the exposure needed to take his career to the next level.

Upon meeting her in 2012, Vindahl started working with MØ, and solely produced and co-wrote her EP Bikini Daze the same year. The Line of Best Fit praised the EP, giving it an 8/10 score and calling it "sensational".

The collaboration with MØ continued on her debut album, No Mythologies to Follow, which was released in 2014. The album, which was co-written, produced and also executively produced by Vindahl, was well received by music critics and won two Danish Gaffa Awards for best pop album and Hit of the year. Between 2012 and 2014 Vindahl also toured with MØ, playing live guitar.

In 2011, Vindahl released the first album under his own name, entitled Serendipity. The title refers to term used in science use to describe when one finds something that wasn't intended. Alan Brown at Soul Seduction praised the album, calling it "Drop dead gorgeous like the most beautiful girl you've ever met!".

In 2015, Vindahl won a Danish Critics Award as best writer, and was also nominated in the best producer-category. The same year, he also won two Danish Writer's Awards for both best pop writer as well as international breakthrough.

In 2017 Vindahl launched the record label Beachy Records - a vanity label on Sony Music - where he functions as label manager and A&R manager.

Discography

Awards and nominations 

2012

 Bet Hiphop Awards – Album of the Year (Kendrick Lamar – Good Kid M.A.A.D City) Writer

2013

 American Music Awards – Favourite Rap/Hip Hop Album (Kendrick Lamar – Good Kid M.A.A.D City) Writer

2014

 Danish Music Award – Producer of the Year
 Danish Music Award – Writer of the Year
 Danish Music Award – Album of the Year (MØ – No Mythologies to Follow) (Won)
 Grammy Awards – Album of the Year (Kendrick Lamar – Good Kid M.A.A.D City) Writer
 BMI Awards – Song of the Year (Kendrick Lamar – "Bitch Don't Kill My Vibe") Writer (Won)

2015

 Danish Critics Award "Steppeulven" – Song of the Year (MØ – Don't Wanna Dance)
 Danish Critics Award "Steppeulven" – Writer of the Year (Won)
 Danish Critics Award "Steppeulven" – Producer of the Year
 Danish Critics Award "Steppeulven" – Album of the Year (MØ – No Mythologies to Follow) (Won)
 Danish Writers Award "Carl-prisen" – Writer of the Year POP (Won)
 Danish Writers Award "Carl-prisen" – International Break through (Won)

References 

Danish electronic musicians
People from Copenhagen
1982 births
Living people